Tangled is a 2010 animated feature film from Disney, adapted from the Brothers Grimm's tale Rapunzel.

Tangled or Tangled Up may also refer to:

Film and television 
Tangled (2001 film), an American thriller film
Tangled (franchise), a Disney franchise, based on the 2010 film
Tangled Ever After, a 2012 short film
Tangled: The Video Game, a 2010 video game based on the animated film
Tangled: The Series, an animated television series based on the animated film
Tangled: Before Ever After, a 2017 TV movie
Tangled, a 2010 TV film by Bronwen Hughes

Music

Albums 
Tangled (Jane Wiedlin album),
Tangled, score album from the 2010 Disney film by Alan Menken
Tangled, 2006 album by Jackie Allen
Tangled (Nick Heyward album), 1995 album by Nick Heyward
Tangled Up (Girls Aloud album), 2007 album by Girls Aloud
Tangled Up Tour, album's supporting concert tour
Tangled Up (Thomas Rhett album), 2015 album by Thomas Rhett

Songs
"Tangled", by Maroon 5 from the album Songs About Jane
"Tangled Up" (Billy Currington song), a 2007 song co-written and recorded by American country music artist Billy Currington
"Tangled Up" (Caro Emerald song), a 2013 song by Dutch jazz singer Caro Emerald
"Tangled Up" (New Found Glory song)
"Tangled Up", by Parade of Lights

See also
Tangle (disambiguation)
Entangled (disambiguation)
Rectangled